Badong Yao (Chinese:八垌瑶语) is an unclassified Sinitic language spoken by the Yao people in Xinning County, Hunan province, China. Badong Yao is currently endangered, and is spoken in the villages of Huangyandong 黄岩峒, Malindong 麻林峒, and Dazhendong 大圳峒 in Huangjin Ethnic Yao Township 黄金瑶族乡, Xinning County. It is also spoken in Malin Ethnic Yao Township 麻林瑶族乡, located just to the east of Huangjin Township.

Vocabulary
The following word list of Badong Yao is from Li (2011:332-334).

References

Varieties of Chinese
Sino-Tibetan languages
Yao people